Say You Love Me may refer to:

Music

Albums
Say You Love Me (Jennifer Holliday album), 1985

Songs
"Say You Love Me" (Char Avell song), 2012
"Say You Love Me" (Fleetwood Mac song), 1975
"Say You Love Me" (Simply Red song), from Blue, 1998
"Say You Love Me" (Jessie Ware song), 2014
"Say You Love Me", a song by Chris Brown and Young Thug, 2020
"Say You Love Me", a song by TWICE, 2018
"Say You Love Me", a song by Dessie O'Halloran, 2001
"Say You Love Me", a song by Demis Roussos, 1974
"Say You Love Me", a song by The Dukays, 1964
"Say You Love Me", a song by Rick Nelson, 1965
"Say You Love Me", a song by Harold Burrage, 1960
"Say You Love Me", a song by Percy Mayfield, 1961
"Say You Love Me", a song by Jo-El Sonnier, 1988
"Say You Love Me", a song by John Lodge, 1977
"Say You Love Me", a song by Lime, 1985
"Say You Love Me", a song by Norman Connors and Starship Orchestra, 1978
"Say You Love Me", a song by Natalie Cole from Snowfall on the Sahara, 1999
"Say You Love Me", a song by Patti Austin from End of a Rainbow, 1976
"Say You Love Me", a song by Rodney Crowell from Jewel of the South, 1995
"Say You Love Me", a song by Serena Onasis, 2013
"Say You Love Me," a song by D. J. Rogers from It's Good to Be Alive, 1975 
"Say You Love Me", a song by Toni Gonzaga from All Me, 2010
"Say You Love Me", a song by James Sampson, placed 9th in Dansk Melodi Grand Prix 2007, Denmark in the Eurovision Song Contest 2007
"Say You Love Me", a song by 2 Quick Start that placed 8th in the national final of Estonia in the Eurovision Song Contest 1999
"Say You Love Me", a song by David Coverdale from Northwinds, 1978
"Say You Love Me", a song by Sizzla from Riddim Driven: X5, 2002
Shuō Nǐ Ài Wǒ, "Say You Love Me", a song by Sherman Chung from Good Girl, 2007
Shuō Nǐ Ài Wǒ, "Say You Love Me" (說你愛我), a song by S.H.E from Play, 2007
Shuō Nǐ Ài Wǒ, "說你愛我" (Say You Love Me), a song by Wilber Pan from Play It Cool, 2007
"Say You Love Me", an Arabic song by Massari, 2008
"Say You Love Me", a song by Little Jimmy Rivers and the Tops, 1959
"Say You Love Me or Say Goodnight", a song by REO Speedwagon from You Can Tune a Piano, but You Can't Tuna Fish, 1978

Other uses
"Say You Love Me", a poem by Molly Peacock from The Best American Poetry 1999
Say You Love Me, a 2004 Korean TV series starring Kim Rae-won

See also
Don't Say You Love Me (disambiguation)
"You Don't Have to Say You Love Me", a song by Dusty Springfield